The 2007–08 season was the 91st season in the existence of RCD Mallorca and the club's 11th consecutive season in the top flight of Spanish football. In addition to the domestic league, Mallorca participated in this season's edition of the Copa del Rey. The season covered the period from 1 July 2007 to 30 June 2008.

Pre-season and friendlies

Competitions

Overview

La Liga

League table

Results summary

Results by round

Matches 
The league fixtures were announced on 13 July 2007.

Copa del Rey

Round of 32

Round of 16

Quarter-finals

References 

RCD Mallorca seasons
Mallorca